Wayne Stewart Andrews (born 19 November 1958 in Melbourne, Victoria) is an Australian cricketer, who played for Western Australia between 1982 and 1995.

Early career
Andrews was born in Melbourne and moved to Western Australia at a young age. He appeared for Western Australia Colts during the 1978–79 and 1979–80 seasons, and was also selected in FW Millett's XI which played a match against Ireland in Belfast in 1979.

Playing career

Western Australia career
Andrews made his first-class debut for Western Australia against South Australia on 25 February 1983, at the Adelaide Oval, making 48 on debut batting at no. 6. He made his List A debut for Western Australia against Victoria in the semi-final of the 1982–83 McDonald's Cup, held at the WACA Ground in Perth.

In total, Andrews played 91 first-class matches, scoring 4684 runs at an average of 37.17, with a highest score of 139 achieved against New South Wales during the 1985–86 season at the WACA Ground. He also took 40 wickets at an average of 39.52 with a best bowling of 3/43. He also played 47 List A matches, scoring 902 runs at an average of 33.40, with a highest score of 103*.

Andrews captained Western Australia in 10 Sheffield Shield matches between 1990 and 1991, and in a single domestic one-day match in 1990.

Lancashire League career
Andrews played matches for Church in the Lancashire League as their professional during the 1987 English cricket season. He played 23 matches was both the club's leading run-scorer and wicket-taker, scoring 771 runs at an average of 38.55, with a highest of 112, and taking 60 wickets at an average of 15.21 bowling left-arm spin, including four 5-wicket hauls, with a best of 6/38.

On 28 July 2000, Andrews was awarded the Australian Sports Medal for his "91 Sheffield Shield career appearances for WA netting 4684 runs and 40 wickets".

See also
 List of Western Australia first-class cricketers

References

External links
Cricinfo Profile
CricketArchive Profile

1958 births
Living people
Western Australia cricketers
Cricketers from Melbourne
Australian cricketers
Recipients of the Australian Sports Medal
Australian cricket coaches